IBB may refer to:

Indiana Business Bulletin, a business-news website
Intentional base on balls, a ploy in baseball
International Brotherhood of Boilermakers, Iron Ship Builders, Blacksmiths, Forgers and Helpers, a US trade union
Institute of Bioinformatics and Biotechnology, a scientific research institute in Pune, India
Institute of Biochemistry and Biophysics, a research institute in Iran
Internet Bug Bounty, a Bug bounty program for Internet-related software
Ibrahim Badamasi Babangida, former President of Nigeria
International Broadcasting Bureau, technical support body for the Voice of America and other US government broadcasting services
Islamic Bank of Britain, now Al Rayan Bank, sharia-compliant bank in the UK
Incredible Bongo Band, former American funk band (1972-1974)
Ibrahim Badamasi Babangida University, university in Nigeria

See also
 Ibb (Arabic: إب), a city in Yemen